Baraut is a city and municipal board, near the city of Baghpat in Baghpat district, Uttar Pradesh, India.

Geography
Baraut is located at 29.6°N 77.16°E, covering an area of 10.36 square kilometers (4.00 sq mi) and lying between the Ganga and Yamuna river plains. Its average elevation is 231 m (758 feet). Baraut is served by NH-709B and state highways SH-57 and SH-82.

Baraut is located 55 kilometers (34 mi) from Delhi (the national capital of India) and 55 kilometers from Meerut, and is within the National Capital Region (NCR).

Demographics

Population
As of 2011 Indian Census, Baraut had a total population of 103,764, of which 55,013 were males and 48,751 were females. Population within the age group of 0 to 6 years was 14,149. The total number of literates in Baraut was 68,690	, which constituted 66.2% of the population with male literacy of 71.8% and female literacy of 59.9%. The effective literacy rate of 7+ population of Baraut was 76.7%, of which male literacy rate was 83.5% and female literacy rate was 69.0%. The Scheduled Castes population was 6,357. Baraut had 17924 in 2011.

Religion 

Most people in the city are followers of Hinduism, with significant population of Muslims and Jains.

Baraut is a multi-religious place with 32 temples, 21 mosques, 1 gurdwara, and 2 churches in Baraut city.

Languages
The official languages of the city is Hindi, and Urdu is the additional official language.

Administration and politics 
Baraut is one of the 403 constituencies of the Uttar Pradesh Legislative Assembly, India. The first election of this assembly constituency was held in 1952. In 1952, Umrao Dutta Ved won the elections and became the first Member of Legislative Assembly (MLA) of Baraut. After the 1969 elections, the constituency was dissolved. In 2008, when the "Delimitation of Parliamentary and Assembly Constituencies Order, 2008" was passed, the constituency was re-constituted and elections were held in 2012. The constituency is assigned identification number 51. Krishan Pal Malik of BJP is the MLA after winning second consecutive term in 2017 and 2022. Dushyant Tomar aka Amit Rana is the Chairman of the town.

Baraut is part of the National Capital Region (NCR). It is part of the Baghpat district, which was established as a separate district in 1997. Prior to that, Baghpat was a tehsil within Meerut district.

See also
Asara, India
Baoli village
Kishanpur baral
List of cities in Uttar Pradesh
Nagla Rawa

References

External links
 Official site of Baraut

Cities and towns in Bagpat district
Cities in Uttar Pradesh
Baraut